The Allison V-3420 was a large experimental piston aircraft engine, designed in 1937 by the American Allison Engine Company.

Design and development
In 1937, at the behest of the United States Army Air Corps, the Allison Engine Company agreed to design and build a large-displacement high-power aircraft engine. The resulting V-3420 was essentially a pair of 12-cylinder Allison V-1710 engines mated to a common crankcase with a 30° angle between the inner cylinder banks. The crankshafts of the two V-1710 engines were geared together to drive a common propeller shaft. Most V-3420 parts were interchangeable with those for V-1710-E and -F engines.

The V-3420 had a power-to-weight ratio of 1.6 kW/kg or 1 hp/lb, excellent for its time. It was envisioned as a powerful yet compact engine for several advanced USAAF projects of the day, including the Douglas XB-19, the Boeing XB-39 Superfortress, the Lockheed XP-58 Chain Lightning, and the Fisher P-75 Eagle. As none of these designs saw more than limited production, only about 150 V-3420s were built.

Variants
V-3420-A16R (-11)
V-3420-A16L (-13)
left-hand rotation of propeller, single-stage supercharger with single-stage turbocharger and intercooler
V-3420-A18R (-17)
V-3420-A24
Supercharger ratio 7.2:1
V-3420-B (-23)
Similar to the -A but with mechanically driven supercharger in two variable-speed stages

Applications
 Boeing XB-39 Superfortress
 Douglas XB-19
 Fisher P-75 Eagle
 Lockheed XP-58 Chain Lightning

Engines on display

 A V-3420-23 (B10) is on public display at the Aerospace Museum of California in North Highlands, California.
 A V-3420 is on public display at the Glenn H. Curtiss Museum in Hammondsport, New York.
 A V-3420-23 engine is on public display at the National Museum of the United States Air Force in Dayton, Ohio alongside a Fisher P-75 Eagle

Specifications (V-3420-A18R (-17))

See also

References

Notes

Bibliography
 Bridgman, Leonard. Jane's All the World's Aircraft 1945-46. Hammersmith, London: HarperCollinsPublishers (1994 reprint). 
Gunston, Bill. World Encyclopedia of Aero Engines: From the Pioneers to the Present Day. 5th edition, Stroud, UK: Sutton, 2006. 
White, Graham. Allied Aircraft Piston Engines of World War II: History and Development of Frontline Aircraft Piston Engines Produced by Great Britain and the United States During World War II. Warrendale, Pennsylvania: SAE International, 1995.  

V-3420
1930s aircraft piston engines
Abandoned military aircraft engine projects of the United States